Rincon Valley is a census-designated place (CDP) in the Rincon Valley, in Pima County, Arizona, United States. The population was 5,139 at the 2010 census.

The racial and ethnic composition of the population was 79.9% non-Hispanic white, 1.5% black or African American, 0.3% Native American, 1.6% Asian, 0.1% non-Hispanic from some other race, 2.5% two or more races and 15.0% Hispanic or Latino.

Demographics

Notes

Census-designated places in Pima County, Arizona